Arabshah Khan (also Romanized as ‘Arabshāh Khān; also known as Harafsheh and Harūsheh) is a village in Yeylaq Rural District of the Central District of Kaleybar County, East Azerbaijan province, Iran. At the 2006 National Census, its population was 510 in 106 households. The following census in 2011 counted 396 people in 99 households. The latest census in 2016 showed a population of 512 people in 182 households; it was the largest village in its rural district.

References 

Kaleybar County

Populated places in East Azerbaijan Province

Populated places in Kaleybar County